Woody is a ghost town in Loving County, Texas, United States.

History
The village was founded in 1910,  when a post office opened there, and closed in 1911. It was named "Woody" after the nickname of a local businessman, Fannin Woodyard Johnson.

Geography

See also
List of ghost towns in Texas

References

Populated places in Loving County, Texas
Ghost towns in West Texas